Frog Island may refer to:

Frog Island, Leicester
Frog Island, London
Frog Island, Mississippi
Frog Island, North Carolina
Pulau Sekudu